Čmelíny is a municipality and village in Plzeň-South District in the Plzeň Region of the Czech Republic. It has about 100 inhabitants.

Administrative parts
The village of Víska is an administrative part of Čmelíny.

References

Villages in Plzeň-South District